Petraliidae is a family of bryozoans belonging to the order Cheilostomatida.

Genera

Genera:
 Mobunula Gordon, 1989
 Mucropetraliella Stach, 1936
 Orbiculipora Guha & Gopikrishna, 2005

References

Cheilostomatida